The Boguty Mountains, also called the "Red Mountains" is a mountain range in the Almaty Oblast, Kazakhstan. They are widely popular among tourists and day trips are made here. The mountains also attract the attention of mountain bikers and Jeepers. The color of these mountains are unusual – from light beige to gray, from light pink to a red-brick color. If you move deeper into the Ulken Boguta range, you can see a fascinating picture on an area of two by two square kilometers, like the colors on an artist's palette, hills of ash, brick, maroon, emerald, purple and fiery red are mixed. It is not only the contrast of colors that looks surprising, but also the quirkiness of the forms that nature has carefully sculpted.

History

Presumably, geologists studying this area believed that the red-colored clays belong to the young Cenozoic deposits of the Trans-ili Alatau. They are widely distributed throughout the Tien Shan. In the Trans-ili Alatau are found everywhere, especially in the Eastern part of the range-in the Bugutinsky mountains. Clays were formed in arid, hot climate and more or less flat terrain, as indicated by their clay composition, red color and gypsum content. The remains of such steppe or savanna-type animals as ancient horses, giraffes, gazelles, turtles and others that were found in the Miocene epoch were found on the territory of the monument. This indicates that red-colored clays are Miocene in age, i.e. 35 million years. Mountains are composed of rocks formed as a result of slow cooling and crystallization of magma in the depths of the earth's crust, as well as products of volcanic eruptions – slags, lava, tuffs. In addition, a variety of sedimentary varieties of rocks – calcareous and clay. Confirmation of this formation of mountains is a large number of minerals located on the surface of the earth. Literally everywhere you can see volcanic tuff formed from cemented volcanic ash, andesite formed from viscous, soup-like lava, the remains of obsidian lava rich in silica, bubbly basalt that occurs when the lava cools. Over millions of years, this loose material was compressed and cemented under the weight of the upper layers, turning into a "hard" stone.
Boguty is characterized by a medium-mountain terrain with characteristic soft and smoothed forms (hills). Some parts of the mountains are called "Kudaibergen Hills", "Koskar Hills". Occasionally, the slopes can be steep and rocky. The middle mountains are bounded on all sides by clear, strongly dissected ledges. In the Boguta mountains, the main sources of surface water are mountain springs. There are no other sources of water in the mountains. The Red mountains are especially beautiful at sunset. When the sun sinks to the horizon, all the hollows that have been dug by water and blown out by the winds are clearly outlined in blue shadows. They mysteriously twinkle with myriads of bright reflections, as if covered with shards of glass. These are gypsum crystals. Dotted the slopes of the mountains, sometimes with small, smooth, glass-like plates, then with quaint columns, cones, needles, and pyramids. They are formed when, when lakes and seas dry out, substances dissolved in water, such as table salt and gypsum, precipitate and crystallize.
A Deposit of tungsten ores was discovered on the Ulken Boguta spur in 1941. Ore bodies are represented by huskies (diorite, diabase-porphyrites). Ore-containing minerals: formality, molybdenite, wolframite.

Location
This ridge is located on the territory of Almaty region. It consists of two spurs: Ulken (Big) and Kishi (Small), which stretch from West to East for 70 km.the Absolute height is 1816 m. the Buguta Mountains are located between the Charyn river valley in the East and the Sogety mountains in the West. To the South of the mountains is the vast, semi-desert Sogeti valley. The Northern slopes of the mountains face the Ili valley with the Ili river. 150 km East of Almaty, between the Chilik and Charyn rivers.
The natural monument is located at the local level. It has a favorable acoustic environment (silence, melodic sounds in nature).

Legends
According to the author of the "Explanatory dictionary of geographical names and terms "of the Mountains of Central Asia" Aldar Gorbunov, Bugutty means deer, the name most likely reflects the name of the Kyrgyz bugu family. It is possible that a bugu tribe once lived in this area. However, Aldar Gorbunov did not stop at the one-sided interpretation of the toponym and put forward another suggestion. "In one historical chronicle," he says, " we find that in the XV century this place was called Bilgutu, Bugutu. Then it is said that the troops of Ulugbek crossed here across the river Bogoti. All this suggests that the segment of the river Charyn in the current tract Sarytogai in those days was called Bugatti. Of course, the ash forest of these places is a great habitat for deer. Later, the name of the river and tract passed to the neighboring mountain range. It is worth paying attention to the fact that the Kazakh language has one very interesting phrase-beget-Seget. It means barrier. Buguts and neighboring Segets are an obstacle to the movement of livestock from winter pastures (kystau) in the ili valley to summer pastures (Zhailau) in the Northern Tien Shan spurs."
Thus, there is still no single accepted and established interpretation of the toponym Boguta. One thing is certain: boguts are the North-Eastern spurs of the Zailiysky Alatau range. Boguts-strange sun-baked mountains!

References

Sources 
 Marikovsky P. I. The Fate Of Charyn. Almaty: Foundation "XXI century", 1997.-120
 Marikovsky P. I. in the deserts of Kazakhstan-M: "Thought" 1978.-125
 A. P. Gorbunov Mountains Of Central Asia. Explanatory dictionary of geographical names and terms. Almaty, 2006

Landforms of Almaty Region
Mountain ranges of Kazakhstan